Rudolph May, Jr. (born July 18, 1944) is an American former professional baseball player. Early in his career, May had a live fastball, but was known best for his "sharp-breaking curve." May was the 1980 American League ERA leader.

Early years
May played high school baseball at Castlemont High School in Oakland, California. One of his high school teammates was future Hall-of-Famer Joe Morgan. Signed by the Minnesota Twins as an amateur free agent in 1962, May was one of the last players in Major League Baseball to be exempt from the later adoption of the Major League Baseball draft (which was formalized in 1964). He pitched in 32 games for Class A Bismarck-Mandan, with 11 wins and 11 losses, pitching 168 innings in 24 games. 

In 1963 May was selected first in the 1963 first-year player draft by the Chicago White Sox. He pitched over 300 innings in 1964, split between the Single-A Tidewater Tides and Triple-A Indianapolis Indians, with 17 wins and 8 losses in 207 innings in 30 appearances.

After the 1964 season, May was traded by the White Sox to the Philadelphia Phillies for catcher Bill Heath and a player to be named later (Joel Gibson). The Phillies then traded May to the California Angels for pitcher Bo Belinsky.

Major League Baseball career
May made his Major League debut at the age of 20 against the Detroit Tigers in 1965 pitching for the Angels. He pitched 9 innings, giving up one run and one hit, while striking out 10 and walking 5, throwing 139 pitches, and received a no-decision. May appeared in 30 games for the Angels in 1965. May pitched in the Angels minor league system from 1966 to 1968, including a stint with the Seattle Angels. He appeared in 45 games over three seasons. He won 18 games and lost 10, in 248 innings.

May returned to the Major Leagues for good in 1969 with the Angels and appeared in 200 games between 1969 and the beginning of the 1974 season as a starter and reliever. Over 1,013 innings, May posted a record of 47 wins and 67 losses with California.

May's contract was purchased by the New York Yankees from the Angels on June 15, 1974. He posted 22 wins and 16 losses in 326 innings over 49 appearances with the Yankees.

Two years to the day after he was acquired by New York, May was acquired along with Rick Dempsey, Scott McGregor, Tippy Martinez and Dave Pagan by the Baltimore Orioles for Ken Holtzman, Doyle Alexander, Elrod Hendricks, Grant Jackson and Jimmy Freeman at the trade deadline on June 15, 1976. He had fallen out of favor with Yankees manager Billy Martin over being removed prematurely from starts. He appeared in 58 games posting a record of 28 wins and 21 losses over 403 innings with the Orioles.

May was traded along with Randy Miller and Bryn Smith from the Orioles to the Montreal Expos for Don Stanhouse, Joe Kerrigan and Gary Roenicke at the Winter Meetings on December 7, 1977. May pitched primarily out of the bullpen for Montreal and recorded 18 wins and 13 losses, appearing in 49 games and recording 237 innings.

May re-signed with the New York Yankees on November 8, 1979. During the 1980 season with New York, May led the American League with an ERA of 2.46, which was his best career mark. Through his final four seasons in Major League Baseball, May won 28 games and lost 27.

In 1965 with the Angels, May earned a salary of $6,000. In 1983, his final year with the Yankees, his salary was $620,000.

Personal life
When May was 17 he enrolled in an underwater diving program. After completion of the course, May was a certified diver.

See also
 List of Major League Baseball annual ERA leaders

References

External links

 Rudy May at SABR (Baseball BioProject)

1944 births
Living people
African-American baseball players
American expatriate baseball players in Canada
American League ERA champions
Baltimore Orioles players
Baseball players from Kansas
Bismarck-Mandan Pards players
California Angels players
Columbus Clippers players
El Paso Sun Kings players
Indianapolis Indians players
Los Angeles Angels players
Major League Baseball pitchers
Montreal Expos players
New York Yankees players
People from Coffeyville, Kansas
San Jose Bees players
Seattle Angels players
Tidewater Tides players
21st-century African-American people
20th-century African-American sportspeople